State Route 435 (SR 435) is a state highway in Sullivan County, Tennessee, that provides access to the Bristol Caverns.

Route description

SR 435 begins at an intersection with US 421 and SR 394. It heads in southeasterly direction and passes Bristol Caverns and finally comes to an end at US 421/SR 44. The entire route is a rural 2-lane highway as it does follow the former alignment of US 421 before the current 4-lane divided highway was built to the south.

Junction list

References

435
Transportation in Sullivan County, Tennessee
Bristol, Tennessee